Jeffrey Glenn Miller (March 28, 1950 – May 4, 1970) was an American student at Kent State University in  Kent, Ohio, who was killed by the Ohio Army National Guard in the Kent State shootings. He had been protesting against the invasion of Cambodia and the presence of the National Guard on the Kent State campus. National Guardsmen opened fire on a group of unarmed students, killing Miller and three others.

Biography
Miller was born on March 28, 1950, in New York, the son of Elaine Holstein and Bernard Miller. He was Jewish.

Four months before his death in May 1970, Miller had transferred to Kent State from Michigan State University. While at Michigan State, Miller pledged Phi Kappa Tau fraternity where his older brother, Russell, had been a member. He and his brother had always been close and shared a birthday. After his brother graduated from Michigan State, Miller found himself feeling increasingly out of touch with the dominant culture at Michigan State. During the summer of 1969, an old friend from New York who attended Kent State urged Miller to consider transferring. He left Michigan State with 4 like-minded friends, also MSU students, in January 1970, traveling together to Ann Arbor. He had protested the Vietnam War with these friends at MSU. He went on to Kent State while 3 of the 5 remained in Ann Arbor. He quickly adapted to Kent State and soon had many friends, including Allison Krause and Sandra Scheuer, who both died with him on May 4.

Miller had taken part in the protests that day and had thrown a tear gas canister back at the Ohio National Guardsmen who had originally fired it. The protests, initially against the expansion of the Vietnam War into Cambodia, had escalated into a protest against the presence of the Ohio National Guard on the Kent State campus. A single bullet entered his open mouth and exited at the base of his posterior skull, killing him instantly. John Filo's Pulitzer Prize-winning photo features Mary Ann Vecchio, a 14-year-old runaway, kneeling over Miller's dead body.

Three other students were shot and killed at Kent State: Allison Krause, Sandra Lee Scheuer, and William Knox Schroeder; nine others were wounded, including one who was paralyzed for life. These and other shootings led to protests and a national student strike, closing hundreds of campuses. The Kent State campus remained closed for six weeks. Five days after the shootings, 100,000 people demonstrated in Washington, D.C., against the war and the military–industrial complex and protesting the killing of unarmed student protestors by American soldiers on a college campus. Eleven days after the Kent State shootings, on May 15, 1970, two students were shot and killed and 12 were injured at Jackson State University by the Jackson Police and Mississippi Highway Safety Patrol officers.

Miller was cremated and his ashes were placed in a niche in the community mausoleum (Unit 7, Alcove H-O, Column O, Niche 1) at Ferncliff Cemetery in Hartsdale, New York. A memorial was erected at Plainview – Old Bethpage John F. Kennedy High School, the high school that was built in the mid-1960s in the same town as Miller's high school in Plainview, New York. Miller's mother had been a secretary to the principal of John F. Kennedy High School in the 1960s.  There is a Kent State Memorial Lecture Fund at MIT established in 1970 by one of Miller’s childhood friends. The university has also placed a memorial at the spot where Miller died.

References

External links
Newsday: A Long Island Student Dies at Kent State
My Son Died 30 years Ago At Kent State by Elaine Holstein, Miller's mother
The May 4 Shootings at Kent State University: The Search for Historical Accuracy, By Jerry M. Lewis and Thomas R. Hensley

Jeffrey Miller: May 4 Archive
FBI files
Genealogical profile of Jeffrey Miller

1950 births
1970 deaths
American anti–Vietnam War activists
20th-century American Jews
Deaths by firearm in Ohio
Kent State shootings
Kent State University alumni
Michigan State University alumni
People from Plainview, New York
Burials at Ferncliff Cemetery
School shootings in Ohio
People notable for being the subject of a specific photograph